Lutila is a village and municipality in Žiar nad Hronom District in the Banská Bystrica Region of central Slovakia.

History
In historical records, the village was first mentioned in 1467.

Geography
The municipality lies at an altitude of 294 metres and covers an area of 26.008 km². It has a population of 1,332 people.

External links
 Town website
 Statistics

Villages and municipalities in Žiar nad Hronom District